Sokoro is an Afro-Asiatic language spoken in central Chad.  Dialects are Bedanga and Sokoro. Speakers make up the majority of the population of Gogmi Canton in Melfi, Chad.

Notes

References
Benton, P. A. 1912. Notes on Some Languages of the Western Sudan. London: Oxford University Press [Reprinted under the title The Languages and Peoples of Bornu with an introduction by A. H. M. Kirk-Greene. London: Frank Cass (1968)].
Chesley, William, and David Faris. 1994. Une enquête sociolinguistique parmi les Sokoro du Guera. N’Djaména: SIL. Manuscript.
Fédry, Jacques. 1971d. Quelques informations sur les langues du groupe ‘sokoro-mubi’. Chadic Newsletter 3.
Jungraithmayr, Herrmann. 2005. Notes sur le système verbal du sokoro (République du Tchad). Afrika und Übersee 88:175–186.
Rendinger, Général de. 1949. Contribution à l’étude des langues nègres du Centre-africain. Journal de la Société des Africanistes. 19(2). 143–194. Online: http://www.persee.fr/web/revues/home/prescript/article/jafr_0037-9166_1949_num_19_2_2599.

East Chadic languages
Languages of Chad